Yellow Fin is a 1951 American action film directed by Frank McDonald and starring Wayne Morris, Lorna Gray and Gloria Henry.

The film's sets were designed by Monogram Pictures's resident art director Dave Milton. Location shooting took place around the port area of Los Angeles including at Terminal Island.

Cast
 Wayne Morris as Mike Donovan 
 Adrian Booth as Nurse Jean Elliott 
 Gloria Henry as Nina Torres 
 Gordon Jones as Breck 
 Damian O'Flynn as Capt. John Donovan 
 Warren Douglas as Dr. Steve Elliott 
 Rick Vallin as Jan 
 Nacho Galindo as Murica 
 Paul Fierro as Mano 
 Guy Zanette as Larson
 Stanley Blystone as Husky Seaman at Table

References

Bibliography
 Tom Weaver. Poverty row horrors!: Monogram, PRC, and Republic horror films of the forties. McFarland, 1993.

External links
 

1951 films
1950s action films
1950s English-language films
American action films
Films directed by Frank McDonald
Monogram Pictures films
Films set in Los Angeles
American black-and-white films
1950s American films